Amara famelica (also known as early sunshiner) is a species of ground beetles from a family of Carabidae, genus Amara.

References

Famelica